The Men's triple jump event  at the 2007 European Athletics Indoor Championships was held on March 2–3.

Medalists

Results

Qualification
Qualifying perf. 16.90 (Q) or 8 best performers (q) advanced to the Final.

Final

References
Results

Triple jump at the European Athletics Indoor Championships
Triple